Tiny Times 2 (Chinese: 小时代：青木时代) is a 2013 Chinese romantic drama film and the second installment of the Tiny Times franchise directed and written by Guo Jingming.  The film was filmed together with the first film, and is based on the second half of Guo's own novel. Tiny Times 3, the third installment of the Tiny Times series was released on July 17, 2014.

Plot
After graduation, the girls gathered together at Gu Li's mansion to celebrate her birthday. However, nobody expected that this would be a hidden veiled event filled with foreboding and betrayal.

A dirty secret was revealed between Gu Li and Nan Xiang's ex-boyfriend, Cheng Xi; causing the sisters to fall out and brothers to turn against each other. Shortly after, Gu Li's father died and she was forced to inherit the company, but is faced with the risk of having her company taken away by business competitors.

Lin Xiao finds out that her boyfriend is cheating on her, but yet could not bear to give up on their relationship. At the same time, she and colleague Zhou Chong Guang starts to get closer.

Cast
 Yang Mi as Lin Xiao
 Kai Ko as Gu Yuan
 Amber Kuo as Gu Li
 Rhydian Vaughan as Gong Ming
 Cheney Chen as Zhou Chong Guang
 Bea Hayden as Nan Xiang
 Evonne Hsieh as Tang Wanru
 Li Yueming as Jian Xi
 Jiang Chao as Xi Cheng
 Calvin Tu as Wei Hai 
 Kiwi Shang as Kitty
 Wang Lin as Ye Chuanping
 Ding Qiaowei as Yuan Yi
 Yolanda Yang as Lin Quan

Original soundtrack

References

External links
 

Chinese romantic drama films
Films set in Shanghai
Films shot in Shanghai
Chinese sequel films
Films based on Chinese novels
Adaptations of works by Guo Jingming
Tiny Times